Marc Quessy is a paralympic athlete from Canada competing mainly in category T52 wheelchair racing events. Before his transition to the wheelchair race Marc was a member of the Canadian wheelchair basketball team who won the silver medal at the gold cup in Melbourne Australia in 1986.

Marc has competed in three Paralympics and every world championship from 1986 until 1999. Marc has won medals and held world record in  distances. 100m,200m,400m,800m as well as the 5000m on the track.  His first in 1988 was arguably his quietest and most successful, competing in only two events, the 100m and marathon, he won two medals, a silver and gold medal respectively.  In 1992 he was much busier competing in all the track events from 200m to marathon including both relays, winning silver in the 200m, 400m and both relays. In 1996 he competed in all the events from 200m to 5000m and the 4 × 400 m relay and won bronze in the 800m and the relay.

References

Paralympic track and field athletes of Canada
Athletes (track and field) at the 1988 Summer Paralympics
Athletes (track and field) at the 1992 Summer Paralympics
Athletes (track and field) at the 1996 Summer Paralympics
Paralympic gold medalists for Canada
Paralympic silver medalists for Canada
Paralympic bronze medalists for Canada
Living people
Medalists at the 1988 Summer Paralympics
Medalists at the 1992 Summer Paralympics
Medalists at the 1996 Summer Paralympics
Paralympic medalists in athletics (track and field)
Canadian male wheelchair racers
Year of birth missing (living people)